Municipal elections were held in the Canadian province of Newfoundland and Labrador on September 28, 2021. This article lists the results in selected municipalities. Results are for mayoral elections unless otherwise specified.

Elections in the communities of Cottlesville and Summerford will be held on October 5, as they were postponed due to the COVID-19 pandemic in Newfoundland and Labrador. Furthermore, the council vote in Logy Bay-Middle Cove-Outer Cove will be delayed, as only one candidate came forward. And in Kippens, the election will be held on November 30 due to complaints of harassment on city council.

Bay Roberts

Clarenville

Mayor

Conception Bay South

Mayor

Corner Brook

Mayor

City Council

Buckle, Tony – 1962

Chaisson, Linda – 3316

Francis-Wheeler, Donna – 2206

Gill, Pamela – 2422

Granter, Vaughn – 2788

Griffin, Bill – 2713

Hickey, Pat – 1772

Keeping, Pam – 2618

Parsons, Robin – 1049

Pender, Charles – 2295

Staeben, Bernd – 2113

Stewart, Tom – 1857

Deer Lake

Gander

Grand Falls-Windsor

Mayor

Town Council

od (Blackie) BENNETT 2043
Mike BROWNE 2870 (Deputy Mayor)
Dave CANNING 1065
Amy COADY-DAVIS 2330
Holly DWYER 2247
Shawn FEENER 1857
Samantha GARDINER 751
Gerry GARDNER 1630
David HILLIER 1469
Bob (Flipper) HISCOCK 2184
Doug KELLY 1226
Andrew LITTLE 2125
Dave NOEL 2502
Kathy OAKE 1161
David OXFORD 1208
Tom PINSENT 1284
Hubert SULLIVAN 310
Wayde THOMPSON 1557
Mark WHIFFEN 1972

Happy Valley-Goose Bay

Labrador City

In 2017, the Labrador City Town Council voted not to hold a separate election for mayor. The elected council chooses a mayor from among themselves.

Marystown

Mount Pearl

Mayor

City Council

Paradise

Mayor

Town Council

Street, Kimberley

2,229	32/32	Elected
Martin, Patrick

2,018	32/32	Elected
Laurie, Elizabeth

1,810	32/32	Elected
Carew, Glen "Bic"

1,669	32/32	Elected
Vaters, Larry 	1,540	32/32	Elected
Quilty, Deborah 	1,344	32/32	Elected
Walley, Simon 	1,337	32/32	Defeated
Thornhill, Jamie

1,064	32/32	Defeated
Kelly, Tony

768	32/32	Defeated

Portugal Cove–St. Philip's

St. John's

Mayor

Deputy Mayor

City Council

Stephenville

Torbay

References

Newfoundland and Labrador municipal elections
2021